Sernur (Šernur) is an urban locality (an urban-type settlement) and the administrative center of Sernursky District of the Mari El Republic, Russia. As of the 2010 Census, its population was 8,686.

Administrative and municipal status
Within the framework of administrative divisions, Sernur serves as the administrative center of Sernursky District. As an administrative division, the urban-type settlement of Sernur, together with three rural localities, is incorporated within Sernursky District as Sernur Urban-Type Settlement (an administrative division of the district). As a municipal division, Sernur Urban-Type Settlement is incorporated within Sernursky Municipal District as Sernur Urban Settlement.

References

Notes

Sources

Urban-type settlements in the Mari El Republic
Vyatka Governorate
